Ernest Normand (1857–1923) was an English painter noted for his historical and Biblical scenes as well as Orientalist works.

Life and career
Ernest Normand was born in London on 30 December 1857. He  painted history and orientalist paintings, and also undertook portraits.

In 1884 he married the painter and writer, Henrietta Rae (1859–1928). They both painted nude figures in lush settings, and were criticised for an apparent tendency towards an excess of sensuality in some of their paintings.

The Normands were based in London from 1885, where Ernest had his studio and received support from the circle around Lord Leighton. They lived in Holland Park, an area known as the residence of many other artists of the day. Frequent visitors to their home included Leighton, Millais, Prinsep, and Watts. These more senior artists adopted the Normands, but their criticism was not always welcome. In her memoirs, Henrietta described the overbearing attitudes and conduct of some of the more senior artists.

In 1890, the Normands travelled to Paris to study at the Académie Julian with Jules Joseph Lefebvre and Jean-Joseph Benjamin-Constant. In 1893, the Normands moved to Upper Norwood, into a studio that was custom-built for them by Normand's father. The couple had two children, a son (born in 1886) and a daughter (born in 1893).

Work 
He  painted history and orientalist paintings, and also undertook portraits. His work was influenced by the Pre-Raphaelites. Normand painted the "King John Granting the Magna Carta" fresco at the Royal Exchange in London (painted 1900, restored 2001).

Select list of paintings and illustrations
 Pygmalion and Galatea, 1886
 Esther Denouncing Haman, 1888
 Death of Pharaoh's First Born, (illustration), 1905
 Queen Vashti Deposed, 1890

See also

 List of Orientalist artists
 Orientalism

References

External links 
British Paintings
Normand Artwork analysis

1859 births
1923 deaths
19th-century English painters
English male painters
20th-century English painters
Académie Julian alumni
Orientalist painters
20th-century English male artists
19th-century English male artists